Northern Illinois University Press is a publisher affiliated with Northern Illinois University and owned by Cornell University Press. The press publishes about twenty new books per year in history, politics, anthropology, and literature, with about 400 books currently in print. In September 2008 the Press launched a fiction imprint, Switchgrass Books, which will publish fiction set in the Midwest.

See also

 List of English-language book publishing companies
 List of university presses

Notes

External links
Northern Illinois University Press
Switchgrass Books

Press
University presses of the United States
Book publishing companies based in Illinois